St. Mary of the Lakes Catholic Church is a historic church building at 108 Stokes Road in Medford Lakes, Burlington County, New Jersey, United States.

It was built in 1931 and added to the National Register of Historic Places in 2007.

See also
National Register of Historic Places listings in Burlington County, New Jersey

References

Roman Catholic Diocese of Trenton
Roman Catholic churches in New Jersey
Churches on the National Register of Historic Places in New Jersey
New Jersey Register of Historic Places
Churches in Burlington County, New Jersey
Roman Catholic churches completed in 1931
National Register of Historic Places in Burlington County, New Jersey
Medford Lakes, New Jersey
20th-century Roman Catholic church buildings in the United States